Mesilat Zion is a moshav in central Israel. Located near Beit Shemesh with an area of 1,000 dunams, it falls under the jurisdiction of Mateh Yehuda Regional Council.

History

The moshav was established on the land of the depopulated Palestinian village of Bayt Mahsir in 1950.

The moshav was established as a work village in 1950 by immigrants from Yemen. After a few years the founders left and were replaced by Cochin Jews. The name of the village is symbolic, as it is located near the Burma Road. It symbolizes the breaking of the siege over Jerusalem during the 1948 Arab–Israeli War, it is based on verses from the Book of Isaiah, chapter 62, "For Zion's sake will I not hold my peace, and for Jerusalem's sake I will not rest....Go through, go through the gates; prepare ye the way of the people; cast up, cast up the highway; gather out the stones; lift up a standard for the people....Say ye to the daughter of Zion, Behold, thy salvation comes."

The Jerusalem Culinary Institute (JCI) founded in 2001 by chef Yochanan Lambiase is located in Mesilat Zion. JCI is the world's first glatt kosher cooking school.

Notable residents
Yuval Noah Harari, history and science writer
Maya Eshet, actress

References

Moshavim
Populated places established in 1950
Populated places in Jerusalem District
Cochin Jews
Indian-Jewish culture in Israel
Yemeni-Jewish culture in Israel
1950 establishments in Israel